Anthony Eugene Zackery (born November 20, 1966 ) was a cornerback at the University of Washington, drafted by the New England Patriots in the 1989 NFL Draft who played for both the NFL's Atlanta Falcons and Patriots.

High school
Zackery attended Franklin High School in Seattle, Washington.

College
Zackery played for the Washington Huskies from 1985 to 1988 for coach Don James.

References

1966 births
Living people
Players of American football from Seattle
American football cornerbacks
Washington Huskies football players
Atlanta Falcons players
New England Patriots players
Franklin High School (Seattle) alumni